The Aveiro lagoon (Ria de Aveiro) is a lagoon in Portugal. It is located on the Atlantic coast of Portugal, south of the municipality of Espinho and north of Mira (to the north of the Cape Mondego). It is named after the city of Aveiro, which is the chief urban centre located near to the lagoon. Other urban centres near the Ria de Aveiro are Ílhavo, Gafanha da Nazaré, Estarreja, Ovar and Esmoriz. Some beaches nearby include those of Barra, Costa Nova, Torreira, Vagueira, Furadouro, Cortegaça and Praia de Mira. There are also beaches in the São Jacinto Peninsula.

The Aveiro Lagoon is beyond a mere geographical feature of Portugal. It is also a haven for numerous bird species. The locals call this rich lagoon Ria de Aveiro. Tourism and aquaculture are the mainstay of the Aveiro Lagoon region. It is also renowned for its artisan fishing and as a center for the collection of flor de sal, an expensive salt variety.

References

Lagoons of Portugal
Geography of Aveiro District
Natura 2000 in Portugal